Bigbee may refer to:

 Bigbee, Alabama, an unincorporated community in Washington County, Alabama
 Bigbee, Mississippi, an unincorporated community in Monroe County, Mississippi, United States
 Bigbee (crater), a crater on Mars